John Brian Brake  (27 June 1927 – 4 August 1988) was a photographer from New Zealand.

Biography
Born in Wellington, New Zealand, Brake was the adopted son of John Samuel Brake and his wife Jennie Brake (née Chiplin). He was raised initially at Doyleston, before his father moved the family to Arthur's Pass, where his father owned the general store, and Christchurch, where he attended Christchurch Boys' High School. His early interest in photography was inspired by his aunt Isabel Brake, who exhibited with the Christchurch Photographic Society, and several of his older cousins.

Brake trained with Wellington portrait photographer Spencer Digby from 1945. Three years later he joined Government filmmaking body the National Film Unit as an assistant cameraman. Brake worked on 17 films at the Unit, mostly as a cameraman, occasionally as a director. Though Brake's skills with studio lighting were utilised, the majority of his work involved the NFU's heavy diet of scenic shorts, including a series of 'snow' films Brake filmed in the Southern Alps. Snows of Aorangi, one of three NFU films Brake directed, was the first New Zealand film nominated for an Academy Award, in the Best Short Subject (Live Action) category in 1958. It was beaten to the Oscar by James Algar's nature film Grand Canyon.

Brake left New Zealand for London in 1954. In 1955, he met Ernst Haas and Henri Cartier-Bresson, members of the photo agency Magnum Photos. This led to his acceptance as a nominee member in the same year, and full membership in 1957. He remained a Magnum photographer until 1967. He worked as freelance photographer in Europe, Africa and Asia until the mid-1960s, when he began working more exclusively for Life magazine.

He is best known for his 1957 and 1959 coverage of China (where he was allowed an unusual level of access) and his 1955 photographs of Pablo Picasso at a bullfight.

His "Monsoon" series of photographs taken in India during 1960 were published internationally in magazines including Life, Queen and Paris Match. Brake used Aparna Das Gupta (now Aparna Sen) as the model for what was to become one of his best known photographs from the "Monsoon" series — a shot of a girl holding her face to the first drops of monsoon rain. The shoot was set up on a Kolkata rooftop with a ladder and a watering can. Sen describes the shoot:

In the same year as he shot "Monsoon", Brake also photographed in New Zealand. The images were published in the best-selling book New Zealand, Gift of the Sea (1963). The book remained in print for over a decade and was republished in an entirely new format and with different images, but the same title, in 1990.

In 1965, Nigel Cameron and Brake published Peking: A Tale of Three Cities, which was dedicated to Brake's father, John Brake. In 1967, Brake and William Warren were commissioned by James Thompson to produce The House on the Klong, which was first published after the mysterious disappearance of silk merchant and former CIA agent James Thompson, in January 1968. This book was the first of many on craft and art objects. Titles include The Sculpture of Thailand (1972), Legend and Reality: Early Ceramics from South-East Asia (1977), Art of the Pacific (1979), and, in collaboration with Doreen Blumhardt, Craft New Zealand: The Art of the Craftsman (1981).

In 1970, Brake founded Zodiac Films in Hong Kong and made documentary films in Indonesia for the following six years.

In 1976, he returned to New Zealand. He commissioned an East Asian influenced architectural award-winning house designed by Ron Sang on Titirangi's Scenic Drive, in the Waitākere Ranges to the west of Auckland; the house has a Category 1 Heritage New Zealand rating. He lived there with his life partner, Wai-man Lau, for the remainder of his life, although he continued to accept freelance assignments abroad. In 1985 he helped establish the New Zealand Centre for Photography.

In the 1981 Queen's Birthday Honours, Brake was appointed an Officer of the Order of the British Empire, for services to photography.

Brake died at Titirangi of a heart attack in 1988.

Brake was careful to retain his negatives and transparencies, as well as copyright, wherever possible. His entire collection of photographs is now housed at the Museum of New Zealand Te Papa Tongarewa. The Museum showed his China work in a 1995 exhibition, Brian Brake: China, the 1950s (with an accompanying book of the same title), and in 1998, Monsoon: Brian Brake's Images of India. Images from this series were published independently in 2007 as Monsoon. In 2010, the Museum mounted a major retrospective exhibition of his work, Brian Brake: Lens on the World, again with a fully illustrated catalogue.

References

External links
 Brian Brake pages at the Museum of New Zealand Te Papa Tongarewa
 Profile and NFU short films at NZ On Screen
 Brian Brake Collection at the Museum of New Zealand Te Papa Tongarewa
 Monsoon exhibition by Brian Brake at the National Gallery of Australia, 1999
 Brake's first published photographs - of an architectural model (1948)
 The Brake House heritage listing

1927 births
1988 deaths
Magnum photographers
Photography in China
Photography in India
Photography in Thailand
People from Wellington City
New Zealand photojournalists
People educated at Christchurch Boys' High School
People associated with the Museum of New Zealand Te Papa Tongarewa
New Zealand Officers of the Order of the British Empire